The Kedah State Legislative Assembly is the state legislature of the Malaysian state of Kedah. It is a unicameral institution, consisting of a total of 36 lawmakers representing single-member constituencies throughout the state.

Members of the unicameral state legislature are called state assemblymen. The Legislative Assembly building is located at the Wisma Darul Aman in the state capital, Alor Setar.

Current composition

Seating arrangement

Role

The Kedah State Legislative Assembly's main function is to enact laws that apply in the state. It is also the forum for members to voice their opinions on the state government's policies and implementation of those policies. Under the law, assemblymen are given the right to freely discuss current issues such as public complaints. On financial matters, the Assembly approves supply to the government and ensures that the funds are spent as approved and in the tax-payers' interest.

The State Executive Council (EXCO) is appointed from members of the State Assembly. Led by the Menteri Besar, it exercises executive power on behalf of the Sultan and is responsible to the Assembly.

Speakers Roll of Honour

The following is the Speaker of the Kedah State Legislative Assembly Roll of Honour, since 1959:

Election pendulum
The 14th General Election witnessed 18 governmental seats and 18 non-governmental seats filled the Kedah State Legislative Assembly. The government side has 1 safe seat and 3 fairly safe seats. However, none of the non-government side has safe and fairly safe seat.  .

List of Assemblies

Notes

See also
 List of State Seats Representatives in Malaysia
 State legislative assemblies of Malaysia

References

External links 

 Kedah State Government official website

 
K
Unicameral legislatures
Politics of Kedah